Elina Elisabeth Eggers (born March 12, 1987 in Stockholm) is a Swedish platform diver. She is a thirteen-time Swedish diving champion, a four-time All-American athlete, and a two-time first-team Pac-10 All-Academic honoree. She also won a bronze medal in the women's platform at the 2008 European Aquatics Championships in Eindhoven, Netherlands, with a score of 319.65, earning her a spot on the Swedish team for the Olympics.

Petre represented Sweden at the 2008 Summer Olympics in Beijing, where she competed as a lone female diver in the women's platform event. She was ranked sixteenth out of twenty-nine divers in the preliminary rounds, until a much better performance in the semi-finals left Petre in ninth position, attaining a score of 315.45. Petre, however, finished only in twelfth place by eleven points behind Japan's Mai Nakagawa, with a score of 285.85.

Petre is also a member of the swimming and diving team for the Arizona State Sun Devils, and an economics graduate at the Arizona State University in Glendale, Arizona.

References

External links
Profile – Arizona State Sun Devils
NBC Olympics Profile

Swedish female divers
Living people
Olympic divers of Sweden
Divers at the 2008 Summer Olympics
Arizona State Sun Devils women's divers
Divers from Stockholm
1987 births
SK Neptun divers